Jane Hurshman Corkum (January 25, 1949 – February 22, 1992) was a Canadian woman best known for having killed her abusive husband Lamont William "Billy" Stafford in 1982, and for being acquitted of his murder.

The Crown appealed, concerned with the legal precedent, and Corkum pleaded guilty to manslaughter, receiving a six-month sentence.  She was released after two months.

On February 23, 1992, her body was found in a car on the Halifax waterfront, dead from a single gunshot wound.

In media
 A made-for-television film, Life with Billy was produced in 1994.
 The song Waltz For Jane by Denis Ryan's 5 Pound Spent.

See also
Jane Hurshman Memorial Fund
Battered person syndrome

Sources

References

1949 births
1992 deaths
Canadian female murderers
Mariticides